In the surviving historical record, medieval Arabic female poets are few compared with the number of known male Arabic-language poets: there has been 'an almost total eclipse of women's poetic expression in the literary record as maintained in Arabic culture from the pre-Islamic era through the nineteenth century'. However, there is evidence that, compared with medieval Europe, women's poetry in the medieval Islamic world was 'unparalleled' in 'visibility and impact'. Accordingly, since the beginning of the twenty-first century, scholars have emphasised that women's contribution to Arabic literature requires greater scholarly attention.

Attestation
The work of medieval Arabic-language women poets has not been preserved as extensively as that of men, but a substantial corpus nonetheless survives; the earliest extensive anthology is the late ninth-century CE Balāghāt al-nisāʾ by Ibn Abī Ṭāhir Ṭayfūr (d. 280/893). Abd al-Amīr Muhannā named over four hundred female poets in his anthology. That much literature by women was once collected in writing but has since been lost is suggested particularly by the fact that al-Suyuti's fifteenth-century Nuzhat al-julasāʼ fī ashʻār al-nisāʼ mentions a large (six-volume or longer) anthology called Akhbar al-Nisa' al-Shau‘a'ir containing 'ancient' women’s poetry, assembled by one Ibn al-Tarrah (d. 720/1320). However, a range of medieval anthologies do contain women's poetry, including collections by Al-Jahiz, Abu Tammam, Abu al-Faraj al-Isfahani, and Ibn Bassam, alongside historians quoting women's poetry such as Muhammad ibn Jarir al-Tabari, Yaqut al-Hamawi, and Ibn 'Asakir.

Medieval women's poetry in Arabic tends to be in two genres: the rithā’ (elegy) and ghazal (love-song), alongside a smaller body of Sufi poems and short pieces in the low-status rajaz metre. One significant corpus comprises poems by qiyan, women who were slaves highly trained in the arts of entertainment, often educated in the cities of Basra, Ta’if, and Medina. Women's poetry is particularly well attested from Al-Andalus.

According to Samer M. Ali,
In retrospect we can discern four overlapping persona types for poetesses in the Middle Ages: the grieving mother/sister/daughter (al-Khansāʾ, al-Khirniq bint Badr, and al-Fāriʿah bint Shaddād), the warrior-diplomat (al-Hujayjah), the princess (al-Ḥurqah, ʿUlayyah bint al-Mahdī, and Walladah bint al-Mustakfī), and the courtesan-ascetic (ʿArīb, Shāriyah, and Rābiʿah al-ʿAdawīyah). Rābiʿah’s biography in particular projects a paradoxical persona that embodies the complementary opposites of sexuality and saintliness.

While most Arabic-speaking medieval woman poets were Muslim, of the three probable medieval female Jewish poets whose work has survived, two composed in Arabic: Qasmūna bint Ismāʿil and the sixth-century Sarah of Yemen (the remaining, Hebrew-language poet being the anonymous wife of Dunash ben Labrat).

Anthologies and studies

Anthologies
 Classical Poems by Arab Women: A Bilingual Anthology, ed. and trans. by Abdullah al-Udhari (London: Saqi Books, 1999),  [includes facing Arabic texts and English translations]
 Dīwān de las poetisas de al-Andalus, ed. by Teresa Garulo (Madrid 1986)
 Poesía femenina hispanoárabe, ed. and trans. by María Jesús Rubiera Mata (Madrid 1990)
 Nisāʾ min al-Andalus, ed. by Aḥmad Khalīl Jumʻah (Damascus: al-Yamāmah lil-Ṭibāʻah wa-al-Nashr wa-al-Tawzīʻ, 2001) [نسـاء من الأندلس, أحمد خليل جمعة].
 Rubiera Máta, María Jesús, Poesía feminina hispanoárabe (Madrid: Castalia, 1989)
 We Wrote in Symbols: Love and Lust by Arab Women Writers, ed. by Selma Dabbagh (London: Saqi Books, 2021), 
 Ibn al-Sāʿī, Consorts of the Caliphs: Women and the Court of Baghdad, ed. and trans. by Shawkat M. Toorawa, Library of Arabic Literature (New York: New York University Press, 2017), Arabic text

Studies
 Hammond, Marlé, Beyond Elegy: Classical Arabic Women's Poetry in Context (Oxford: Oxford University Press, 2010), 
 Myrne, Pernilla, Female Sexuality in the Early Medieval Islamic World: Gender and Sex in Arabic Literature, The Early and Medieval Islamic World (London: I. B. Tauris, 2020)

Known female poets
The following list of known women poets is based on (but not limited to) Abdullah al-Udhari's Classical Poems by Arab Women. It is not complete.

Jahilayya (4000 BCE–622 CE)
 Mahd al-Aadiyya (c. 4000 BCE)
 Afira bint 'Abbad (C3 CE)
 Laila bint Lukaiz (d. 483 CE)
 Jalila bint Murra (d. 540 CE)
 Umama bint Kulaib (C5–6 CE)
 al-Ḥujayjah, aka Safīyah bint Thaʻlabah al-Shaybānīyah (C5–6 CE)
 al-Ḥurqah (C5–6 CE)
 Safiyya bint Khalid al-Bahiliyya
 Juhaifa Addibabiyya
 Umm Khalid Annumairiyya
 Ishraqa al-Muharibiyya
 Umm Jamil bint Harb (C6–7 CE)
 Hind bint al-Khuss al-Iyādiyya (legendary, supposedly C6-7 CE)
 Hind bint ‘Utbah (C6-7 CE)
 Qutayla ukht al-Nadr (C7 CE)
 Umm Addahak al-Muheribiyya
 Janūb Ukht ‘Amr dhī-l-Kalb
 al-Fāriʿah bint Shaddād
 al-Khansa (d. 646 CE)
 Sarah of Yemen (C6 CE)

Muhammad Period (622–661 CE)

 Al-Khansa, was one of the most influential poets of the pre-Islamic and early Islamic periods.
 Fatima bint Muhammad (605–632 CE)
 'Amra bint Mardas. Daughter of al-Khansa.
 Atiqa bint Zayd was the companion of Muhammad and an Arab poet.

Umayyad Period (661–750 CE)

 Laila bint Sa'd al-Aamiriyya (d. 668 CE)
 Maisūn bint Jandal (c. C7 CE)
 Ḥumayda bint Nu‘mān ibn Bashīr (C7 CE)
 Laila al-Akhyaliyya (d. 75×90 AH/694×709 CE)
 Dahna bint Mas-hal (c. C7–8 CE)
 Bint al-Hubab
 Umm al-Ward al-Ajlaniyya
 Umaima Addumainiyya (C8 CE)

Abbasid Period (750–1258 CE)

 Hajna bint Nusaib (c. C8–9 CE)
 Raabi'a al-Adwiyya (714–801 CE)
 Laila bint Tarif (d. 815 CE)
 'Ulayya bint al-Mahdi (777–825 CE)
 Lubāna bīnt ‘Alī ibn al-Mahdī (c. C8–9 CE)
 Inan (d. 841 CE)
 'Asiya al-Baghdadiyya (c. C9 CE)
 Zahra al-Kilabiyya (c. C8–9 CE) 
 Aa'isha bint al-Mu'tasim (c. C8–9 CE)
 Shāriyah (c. 815-70 CE)
 Fadl Ashsha'ira (d. 871 CE)
 Zabba bint Umair ibn al-Muwarriq (c. C9 CE) 
 Juml (C9 CE)
 Fatima al-Suqutriyya (C9 CE)
 Umm Ja'far bint 'Ali
 Arib al-Ma'muniyya (797–890 CE)
 Thawab bint Abdullah al-Hanzaliyya
 Salma bint al-Qaratisi (c. C12 CE) 
 Safiyya al-Baghdadiyya (C12 CE)
 Taqiyya Umm Ali bint Ghaith ibn Ali al-Armanazi (a.k.a. Sitt al-Ni‘m, 1111-1183/4)
 Shamsa al-Mawsiliyya (C13 CE)

Andalus Period (711–1492 CE)

 Aziz (court of Al-Hakam I, early C9 CE)
 Hafsa bint Hamdun (C10 CE)
 Aa'isha bint Ahmad al-Qurtubiyya (d. 1010 CE)
 Mariam bint Abu Ya'qub Ashshilbi (d. 1020 CE)
 Umm al-Kiram bin al-Mu'tasim ibn Sumadih (d. 1050 CE)
 Umm al-Ala bint Yusuf (d. 1050 CE)
 Khadija bint Ahmad ibn Kulthum al-Mu'afiri (C10–11 CE)
Al-Ghassaniyya al-Bajjaniyya (C10–11 CE)
 Qasmuna bint Isma'il (C11 CE)
 Wallada bint al-Mustakfi (d. 1091 CE)
 Umm al-Fath bint Jafar (fl. C11), author of the lost Kitab fi qiyan al-Andalus (The Book of the Qiyan of al-Andalus)
 Suada (fl. C11)
 I'timad Arrumaimikiyya (b. 1045×47 CE)
 Muhja bint Attayyani al-Qurtubiyya (d. 1097 CE)
 Nazhun al-Gharnatiyya (d. 1100 CE)
Zaynab al-Mariyya (C11–13 CE)
 Amat al-Aziz (C12 CE)
 Buthaina bint al-Mu'tamid ibn Abbad (1070–? CE)
 Hind (C12 CE)
 Umm al-Hana bint Abdulhaqq ibn Atiyya (C12 CE)
 Hafsa bint al-Hajj Arrakuniyya (d. 1190 CE)
 Ashshilbiyya (C12 CE)
 Aa'isha al-Iskandraniyya
 Hamda bint Ziyad (c. 1204 CE)
 Umm Assa'd bint Isam al-Himyari (d. 1243 CE)

References

Poets of the medieval Islamic world

Lists of poets